Jafarkhan may refer to:

Jafarkhan, Kurdistan
Jafarkhan, Lorestan
Jafarkhan-e Zeytun
Jafarkhan, alternate name of Jafarabad, Kuhdasht